The 1911–12 Magyar Kupa (English: Hungarian Cup) was the 3rd season of Hungary's annual knock-out cup football competition. MTK Budapest FC won because Ferencvárosi TC walked over.

See also
 1911–12 Nemzeti Bajnokság I

References

External links
 Official site 
 soccerway.com

1911–12 in Hungarian football
1911–12 domestic association football cups
1911-12